Sviblovo District  is an administrative district (raion) of North-Eastern Administrative Okrug, and one of the 125 raions of Moscow, Russia.

See also
Administrative divisions of Moscow

References

1995 establishments in Russia
Districts of Moscow
North-Eastern Administrative Okrug
States and territories established in 1995